Qasemabad (also Romanized as Qāsemābād and Qāsimābād; Kalāteh-ye Qāsemābād, and Ghasem Abad Mo’men Abad) is a village in Miyandasht Rural District, in the Central District of Darmian County, South Khorasan Province, Iran. At the 2006 census, its population was 38, in 8 families.

References 

Populated places in Darmian County